Umeed is a 1962 Bollywood Hindi film, directed by Nitin Bose, with Ashok Kumar, Joy Mukherjee, Nanda, Leela Naidu, Agha and Leela Mishra playing the lead roles.

The film has a hit music by Ravi and lyrics by Shakeel Badayuni with song like Mujhe Ishq Hai Tujh Hi Se sung by Mohammed Rafi becoming all-time hit. In a rare instance, Ravi, the music director sang two of the songs too in the movie.

Cast
Ashok Kumar as Jwalaprasad
Joy Mukherjee as Shankar
Nanda as Leela
Leela Naidu as Mala
 Kartar Singh as Sikh man gatekeeper at mill
 Leela Mishra as Leela Naidu
 Tarun Bose as Shukla
 Jankidas
 Chandrima Bhaduri as Shankar's Mother
 Sabita Chatterjee as Rosie
 Ravikant as Doctor
 Nazir Kashmiri as Servant
 Madhumati as Dancer, singer
 Jeevan Kala as Dancer, singer
 Laxmi Chhaya as Dancer, singer

Soundtrack

References

External links

1962 films
1960s Hindi-language films